Daniele Borra (born 28 July 1995) is an Italian footballer who plays as a goalkeeper for  club Virtus Entella.

Club career
He made his Serie C debut for Arezzo on 25 November 2016 in a game against Giana Erminio.

On 6 August 2018, he was signed by Carrarese on loan.

References

External links
 

1995 births
Living people
People from Chivasso
Footballers from Piedmont
Italian footballers
Association football goalkeepers
Serie C players
Serie D players
Valenzana Mado players
Virtus Entella players
Hellas Verona F.C. players
S.S.D. Lucchese 1905 players
Taranto F.C. 1927 players
S.S. Arezzo players
Carrarese Calcio players
Sportspeople from the Metropolitan City of Turin